Proton City Stadium is located at Proton City, Muallim District, Perak, Malaysia. This stadium can accommodate 3,000 spectators. The stadium is built by Proton Holdings Berhad and currently use as the official home ground for DRB-HICOM Football Club competing in Malaysia Premier League since 2015.

See also
 Proton (automobile)

External links
 Proton Holdings Berhad's Official Website
 Proton City Stadium's Location

Football venues in Malaysia
Athletics (track and field) venues in Malaysia
Muallim District
Multi-purpose stadiums in Malaysia
Sports venues in Perak